Demino is a rural locality (a village) in Verkh-Invenskoye Rural Settlement, Kudymkarsky District, Perm Krai, Russia. The population was 324 as of 2010. There are 7 streets.

Geography 
Demino is located 37 km southwest of Kudymkar (the district's administrative centre) by road. Senina is the nearest rural locality.

References 

Rural localities in Kudymkarsky District